Oltacola is a genus of ammotrechid camel spiders, first described by Carl Friedrich Roewer in 1934.

Species 
, the World Solifugae Catalog accepts the following four species:

 Oltacola chacoensis Roewer, 1934 — Argentina
 Oltacola goetschi Lawatsch, 1944 — Argentina
 Oltacola gomezi Roewer, 1934 — Argentina
 Oltacola mendocina Mello-Leitão, 1938 — Argentina

References 

Arachnid genera
Solifugae